Randa Mahmoud (born 20 August 1987) is an Egyptian Paralympic powerlifter. She won a gold medal in the 86 kg division at the 2016 Paralympics, placing second in 2008 and 2012 in lighter categories.

At the 2014 IPC Powerlifting Championships in Dubai, Randa had to witness Loveline Obiji from Nigeria being awarded the gold medal after her world record setting last lift was not allowed. However Mahmoud appealed and her lift was allowed giving her the gold medal and the world record.

References

Egyptian powerlifters
Paralympic powerlifters of Egypt
Powerlifters at the 2008 Summer Paralympics
Powerlifters at the 2012 Summer Paralympics
Powerlifters at the 2016 Summer Paralympics
1987 births
Living people
Paralympic gold medalists for Egypt
Paralympic silver medalists for Egypt
Medalists at the 2008 Summer Paralympics
Medalists at the 2012 Summer Paralympics
Medalists at the 2016 Summer Paralympics
Female powerlifters
African Games silver medalists for Egypt
African Games medalists in weightlifting
Competitors at the 2015 African Games
Paralympic medalists in powerlifting
Powerlifters at the 2020 Summer Paralympics
21st-century Egyptian women